Jerry Levin may refer to:
 Jerry Levin (journalist), CNN network journalist, kidnapped and held hostage by Hezbollah
 Jerry W. Levin, American businessman, CEO, turnaround expert and mergers & acquisitions specialist
 Gerald M. Levin, known as Jerry, American mass-media businessman